1929 was the 36th season of County Championship cricket in England. South Africa were on tour and England won the Test series 2–0. In domestic cricket, Nottinghamshire overcame their two northern rivals, Lancashire and Yorkshire, to win the County Championship.

Honours
County Championship - Nottinghamshire
Minor Counties Championship - Oxfordshire
Wisden - Ted Bowley, K S Duleepsinhji, Tuppy Owen-Smith, Walter Robins, Bob Wyatt

Test series

England defeated South Africa 2–0 with three matches drawn.

County Championship

Leading batsmen
Jack Hobbs topped the averages with 2263 runs @ 66.55

Leading bowlers
Dick Tyldesley topped the averages with 154 wickets @ 15.57

Annual reviews
 Wisden Cricketers' Almanack 1930

External links
 CricketArchive – season summary

References

1929 in English cricket
English cricket seasons in the 20th century